This is a partial list of cases decided by the Supreme Court of Ireland, the highest court in the Republic of Ireland.  The list is organized chronologically within areas of law.

Constitutional

Criminal

Family

Finance

Immigration

Procedural

Tort

See also 
High Court (Ireland)

External links 
Supreme Court of Ireland
Supreme Court of Ireland decisions from the British and Irish Legal Information Institute

References 

Supreme Court of Ireland cases
Irish Supreme Court
Legal history of Ireland